The following is a list of the 317 communes of the Allier department of France.

Intercommunalities 

The communes cooperate in the following intercommunalities (as of 2020):
Communauté d'agglomération Montluçon Communauté (CAML)
Communauté d'agglomération Moulins Communauté (CAMO, partly)
Communauté d'agglomération Vichy Communauté (CAV)
Communauté de communes du Bocage Bourbonnais
Communauté de communes Commentry Montmarault Néris Communauté
Communauté de communes Entr'Allier Besbre et Loire
Communauté de communes Le Grand Charolais (partly)
Communauté de communes du Pays d'Huriel
Communauté de communes du Pays de Lapalisse
Communauté de communes du Pays de Tronçais
Communauté de communes Saint-Pourçain Sioule Limagne
Communauté de communes du Val de Cher

List of communes 
List of the 317 communes:

Former communes 
Former communes in Allier (communes nouvelles):
 Givarlais, Louroux-Hodement, Maillet merged into Haut-Bocage on 1 January 2016;
 Meaulne, Vitray merged into Meaulne-Vitray on 1 January 2017.

References 

Allier